The Sūlaimānī Jamia (Jamia-e Sūlaymānīyyā / Süleyman Efendi Cemaati) or Süleymanlılar (Sūlaymanites) is a Muslim Sunni-Hanafi jamia based in Turkey. It takes its name from Süleyman Hilmi Tunahan.  In the early 1990s it was estimated that there were over two million members in Turkey. There are also independent branches in Germany and United States.

Ahmet Denizolgun and Mehmet Denizolgun are Turkish politicians associated with the group.

The Süleyman’îyyah tariqa silsila

References

Sufi orders
Islam in Turkey
Naqshbandi order